State Road 1113 (NM 1113) is an approximately  state highway in the US state of New Mexico. NM 1113's southern terminus is at the end of state maintenance in Playas, and the northern terminus is at NM 9 east of Windmill. NM 1113 is one of only three four-digit state highways in New Mexico (the others being NM 5001 and NM 6563).

History
NM 1113 was originally Hidalgo County Route 113 but was transferred to the state on December 12, 1995 in a road exchange agreement.

Major intersections

See also

References

1113
Transportation in Hidalgo County, New Mexico